Toyin Adekale (often referred to as Toyin; born 21 December 1963) is a British Lovers rock singer.

Adekale first had success as a member of London reggae band The Instigators, which also featured Mafia & Fluxy. She topped the British reggae charts with her single "Let's Make Love". She went on to form the group Pure and Simple, also managing the group. She was one of a number of reggae artists to contribute to the British Reggae Artists Famine Appeal, singing on the "Let's Make Africa Green Again" charity single in 1985.

Toyin Adekale has graced the stage of Presidents and Royalty, performing at the Kremlin in Russia, the Palace in London, the Houses of Parliament to name but a few.  Performing for HRH Prince Charles,the former President of Nigeria Olusegun Obasanjo, also the Sierra Leonian late President Joseph Saidu Momoh, amongst other famous dignitaries and celebrities.

After Adekale's 13-year stint with world-famous band Boney M featuring Maizie Williams, she left for the United States, taking time out of her successful 35-year span in show business.

Toyin's most memorable hits are "Touch A Four Leaf Clover" produced by Anthony Brightley on the Sir George Label.  There followed hits with Delroy Murray and Robin Achampong of Total Contrast, "Gee Baby", "Here I Go Again" and the 'Love n Leather Album.
She had a combination hit in 1995 with Daddy Screw with "Man With The Agony".

Toyin has worked with many great artists such as Soul II Soul, Maxi Priest
Music brought Toyin in the world of theater via, friend and Director Larrington Walker for the Afro Sax Theater company that brought forth many great names to the British Acting platform, such as Ellen Thomas and Treva Etienne to name but a few.

Since living in the US, Toyin has also penned her first book "I Do, Do You?", and has since penned her first produced play taken from the book, called "It's Not Over Til It's Over"

Discography
"Let's Make Love" (1980), Love Birds
"Touch A 4 Leaf Clover" (1983), Sir George Label
Love 'N' Leather (1985), Criminal Records
"Gee Baby" (1988), Criminal Records
"Here I Go Again" (1985) Criminal Records
"Jealousy" (1996), Merger Records
From Me to You (2000), Jet Star
I'll Be Moving On (2005), Talithavoices
"When" (2004), Talithavoices
No Fear album (2011), Talithavoices
"I Do, Do You?" (2010), Talithavoices "I Do, Do You?" - CD Single
"The Storm is Over" (2011), Talithavoices
"With You I'm Born Again" (2012), Talithavoices
The Storm is Over - Sunshine's Here (2014), Talithavoices
"Thank You Mama (2016), Talithavoices
"Raining Abundance H&H Mix (2019) Talithavoices
"I'm That Woman" (2022) Talithavoices

References

External links

1963 births
Living people
British reggae musicians
British women singers
Lovers rock musicians